Front end may refer to:

Computing
 Front-end (computing), an interface between the user and the back end
 Front-end processor (computer), a small-sized computer
 Front-end processor (program)
 Front-end web development, the practice of producing HTML, CSS and JavaScript for a website or web application
 Front-end API, a type of application program interface
 Compiler front-end
 Debugger front-end

Other
 Front-end bra, a stretchy type of vinyl that attaches to the front of a car
 Front-end, the foremost of a vehicle body
 Front-end engineering
 Front-end load, a charge in investing
 Front-end loader, construction equipment
 Front-end loading, in project management
 Front End Loader, a band
 RF front end, in electronics

See also
 
 
 Front (disambiguation)
 End (disambiguation)
 Back end (disambiguation)